The Consulate General of the United States of America, Ho Chi Minh City represents the interests of the United States government in Ho Chi Minh City (formerly known as Saigon), Vietnam. The consulate reports to the ambassador at the U.S. Embassy in Hanoi. Prior to the Reunification of Vietnam in 1975, the Consulate General served as the U.S. Embassy Saigon, South Vietnam.

The Consulate General was dedicated in a ceremony on September 8, 1999 by US Secretary of State Madeleine Albright.

References

External links
  (English and Vietnamese)

Diplomatic missions in Ho Chi Minh City
Diplomatic missions of the United States
United States–Vietnam relations